Frank O'Rourke (born 15 May 1967) is a former Irish Fianna Fáil politician who served as a Teachta Dála (TD) for the Kildare North constituency from 2016 to 2020.

O'Rourke was born in Sligo in 1967. He is a native of County Leitrim, O'Rourke was first co-opted onto Kildare County Council in January 2011 to replace Paul Kelly. He retained his seat in the 2014 local elections, topping the poll in the Celbridge-Leixlip local electoral area, with 1,814 first preference votes.

At the 2016 general election, he was elected as a Fianna Fáil TD for Kildare North to Dáil Éireann, and was subsequently appointed as Fianna Fáil junior spokesperson on Financial Services, eGovernment and Procurement by party leader Micheál Martin.

O'Rourke lost his seat at the 2020 general election. He blamed his defeat on a smear campaign against him, which involved both social media posts and leaflets, and took legal proceedings against Facebook and Twitter seeking to identify the people involved. The orders were granted in late 2020, and Twitter supplied the information sought. However, Facebook claimed to be unable to retrieve the data.

References

External links

Frank O'Rourke's page on the Fianna Fáil website 

Living people
Members of the 32nd Dáil
Fianna Fáil TDs
Local councillors in County Kildare
1969 births
Alumni of the Institute of Technology, Sligo